Central Province may refer to:
Central Province (Kenya)
Central Province, Maldives
Central Province (Papua New Guinea)
Central Province (Solomon Islands)
Central Province, Sri Lanka
Central Province (Victoria), an electorate of the Victorian Legislative Council, Australia, 1856–1882
Central Province (Western Australia), an electoral province of the Legislative Council of Western Australia, 1894–1989
Central Province, Zambia
Central Provinces, India, 1861-1936
Central Provinces and Berar, a province of British India 1936-1950 corresponding roughly to Madhya Pradesh
Centre Province, Cameroon
Markazi province, Iran
Madhya Pradesh, India
Töv Province, Mongolia
Central province may also refer to the province in the centre of the country, such as:
 Manitoba, Canada

See also
 Central provinces (disambiguation)

Province name disambiguation pages